Strépy-Bracquegnies is a village in Wallonia, Belgium. It is a district of the municipality of La Louvière in the province of Hainaut. It is around 6 km west of the centre of La Louvière, and around 50 km south-west of Brussels.

See also
 Morlanwelz train collision and runaway
 Strépy-Thieu boat lift
 Thieu
 2022 Strépy-Bracquegnies car crash

Gallery

External links

Former municipalities of Hainaut (province)
La Louvière